The 2013 Judo World Masters was held in Tyumen, Russia, from 25 to 26 May 2013.

Medal summary

Medal table

Men's events

Women's events

References

External links
 

IJF World Masters
World Masters
Judo
Judo in Russia
Judo